John Noel (1702–1728) was a British politician who sat in the House of Commons between 1727 and 1728.
 
Noel was the son of Hon. John Noel and his wife  Elizabeth Sherard, daughter of Bennet Sherard, 2nd Baron Sherard and was born on 15 December 1702. He succeeded his father in 1718.

Noel was returned unopposed as Member of Parliament for Rutland   at the 1727 general election. He died four months later on 6 January 1728. He was succeeded by his brother Thomas.

References

1702 births
1728 deaths
British MPs 1727–1734
Members of the Parliament of Great Britain for English constituencies